Tobenna "Toby" Jonathan Uzo (born October 13, 1994) is a Nigerian footballer. His brother is fellow footballer Uchenna Uzo.

Career
Uzo attended Houston Baptist College in 2012, but did not play college soccer until 2013. Uzo transferred to Coastal Carolina University in 2015 for his senior year.

On January 19, 2016, Uzo was selected in the fourth round (68th overall) of the 2016 MLS SuperDraft by Orlando City SC. He was not signed by Orlando and later joined National Premier Soccer League with Myrtle Beach Mutiny in 2016,. He also stayed with the club when they moved to the USL PDL in 2017.

Uzo signed a professional contract with USL club Colorado Springs Switchbacks on August 29, 2017.

On January 4, 2019, Uzo joined USL Championship side FC Tulsa. He was given the Goal of the Year award by fan vote in both 2019 and 2020.

Uzo was signed by FC Tucson after a brief stint with FC Arizona of the NPSL on July 1, 2021.

References

External links
Switchbacks bio

1994 births
Living people
Nigerian footballers
Houston Christian Huskies men's soccer players
Coastal Carolina Chanticleers men's soccer players
Colorado Springs Switchbacks FC players
FC Tulsa players
FC Tucson players
Association football forwards
Expatriate soccer players in the United States
USL League One players
USL League Two players
USL Championship players
National Premier Soccer League players
Orlando City SC draft picks